San Esteban ("St. Stephen" in Spanish) is a city and commune in the Los Andes Province of central Chile's Valparaíso Region.

Demographics
Of these, 7,542 (52.4%) lived in urban areas and 6,858 (47.6%) in rural areas. The population grew by 18.5% (2,247 persons) between the 1992 and 2002 censuses.

Administration
As a commune, San Esteban is a third-level administrative division of Chile administered by a municipal council, headed by an alcalde who is directly elected every four years. The 2008-2012 alcalde is René Mardones Valencia (Ind.).
 Julio Figueroa Contreras
 Geovanna Serey Lizana
 Gabriel Bianchini Frost
 Julio Contreras Tapia
 Alejo Rodriguez Toledo
 Benjamin Olguin Cáceres

Within the electoral divisions of Chile, San Esteban is represented in the Chamber of Deputies by Marco Antonio Núñez (PDC) and Gaspar Rivas (RN) as part of the 11th electoral district, (together with Los Andes, Calle Larga, Rinconada, San Felipe, Putaendo, Santa María, Panquehue, Llaillay and Catemu). The commune is represented in the Senate by Ignacio Walker Prieto (PDC) and Lily Pérez San Martín (RN) as part of the 5th senatorial constituency (Valparaíso-Cordillera).

References

External links

  of San Esteban

Populated places in Los Andes Province
Communes of Chile